is a Japanese footballer who plays for Albirex Niigata on loan from Tokushima Vortis.

Club statistics
Updated to 2 May 2021.

References

External links

Profile at Kamatamare Sanuki

1988 births
Living people
Ryutsu Keizai University alumni
Association football people from Okayama Prefecture
Japanese footballers
J2 League players
J3 League players
Japan Football League players
Kamatamare Sanuki players
Tokushima Vortis players
Albirex Niigata players
Association football goalkeepers